Ormr may refer to:

 Germanic dragon
 Bloom Image Editor, formerly known as "Ormr"
 Ormr, a figure in the Old Norse saga Morkinskinna